Cnemaspis temiah is a species of gecko from Cameron Highlands, Pahang, Malaysia.

References

Further reading
Amarasinghe, AA Thasun, et al. "A New Species of Cnemaspis (Reptilia: Gekkonidae) from Sumatra, Indonesia", Herpetologica 71.2 (2015): 160–167.

Cnemaspis
Reptiles described in 2014